Mohammad Ousani is an Iranian football winger who plays for F.C. Pars Jonoubi Jam.

Club career

Esteghlal Khuzestan
He joined Esteghlal Khuzestan after shining in Hazfi Cup with Shahrdari Dezful. He made his debut for Esteghlal Khuzestan in 2013–14 Iran Pro League against Saipa as a starter. As of December 2014, he was released from Esteghlal Khuzestan.

Saba
Ousani joined Saba Qom on 28 December 2014 with an 18-month contract.

Gostaresh Foulad

Nassaji Mazandaran

Club career statistics

References

External links
 Mohammad Ousani at PersianLeague.com
 Mohammad Ousani at IranLeague.ir

1992 births
Living people
People from Andimeshk
Iranian footballers
Esteghlal Khuzestan players
Saba players
Gostaresh Foulad F.C. players
Nassaji Mazandaran players
Association football wingers
Sportspeople from Khuzestan province